A check or check mark (American English), checkmark (Philippine English), tickmark (Indian English) or tick (Australian, New Zealand English, and British English) is a mark (✓, ✔, etc.) used, primarily in the English-speaking world, to indicate the concept "yes" (e.g. "yes; this has been verified", "yes; that is the correct answer", "yes; this has been completed", or "yes; this [item or option] applies"). The x mark is also sometimes used for this purpose (most notably on election ballot papers, e.g. in the United Kingdom), but otherwise usually indicates "no", incorrectness, or failure. One of the earliest usages of a check mark as an indication of completion is on ancient Babylonian tablets "where small indentations were sometimes made with a stylus, usually placed at the left of a worker's name, presumably to indicate whether the listed ration has been issued."

As a verb, to check (off) or tick (off) means to add such a mark. Printed forms, printed documents, and computer software (see checkbox) commonly include squares in which to place check marks.

International differences
The check mark is a predominant affirmative symbol of convenience in the English-speaking world because of its instant and simple composition. In other language communities, there are different conventions.

In Japan, the O mark is used instead of the check mark, and the X or ✓ mark are commonly used for wrong.

In the Netherlands a 'V' is used to show that things are missing  while the flourish of approval (or krul) is used for approving a section or sum.

Unicode
Unicode provides various check marks:

See also
 Bracket
 O mark
 Tally marks
 Thumbs signal
 X mark

References

External links

 Checkmark at Fileformat.info
 Checkmark at Unicode-Table.com

Pictograms
Symbols
Typographical symbols